Michael Porter (born 1947) is an American academic

Michael Porter may also refer to:
Michael Porter (wrestling) (1951–2010), American professional wrestling ring announcer and internet radio host
Michael Porter Jr. (born 1998), American basketball player
Michael Porter (footballer) (born 1945), Australian rules footballer
Michael Porter (cricketer) (born 1995), English cricketer
Michael Porter (rugby league) (born 1964), Australian rugby league player
Michael G. Porter (Tasman Institute) Australian think-tank founder and economist